The Shenzhen Open (also known as the Shenzhen Gemdale Open for sponsorship purposes) is a professional women's tennis tournament. It is played on outdoor hard courts of the Shenzhen Longgang Tennis Center, which has 32 outdoor and indoor courts and a 4,000-seat stadium. The tournament made its debut on the WTA Tour in 2013 in Shenzhen, China. The tournament takes place during the first week of the year, as a warm-up event two weeks prior the Australian Open.

Past finals

Women's singles

Women's doubles

References

External links
Official WTA site
WTA Tour profile

 
Recurring sporting events established in 2013
Tennis tournaments in China
Hard court tennis tournaments
WTA Tour
Sport in Shenzhen
2013 establishments in China
Sports competitions in Guangdong